The 2013–14 Minnesota Timberwolves season is the 25th season for the franchise in the National Basketball Association (NBA).

Key dates
 June 27: The 2013 NBA draft took place at Barclays Center in Brooklyn, New York.
 July 1: 2013 NBA free agency began.

Draft picks

Roster

Pre-season

|- style="background:#fcc;"
| 1
| October 7
| CSKA Moscow
| 
| Derrick Williams (21)
| Derrick Williams (9)
| Kevin Love (5)
| Target Center9,111
| 0–1
|- style="background:#cfc;"
| 2
| October 9
| @ Toronto
| 
| Kevin Love (20)
| Kevin Love (9)
| Ricky Rubio (7)
| Air Canada Centre17,261
| 1–1
|- style="background:#cfc;"
| 3
| October 10
| Milwaukee
| 
| Othyus Jeffers (13)
| Gorgui Dieng (9)
| José Juan Barea (4)
| The Pentagon3,250
| 2–1
|- style="background:#fcc;"
| 4
| October 12
| Toronto
| 
| Kevin Love (28)
| Kevin Love (11)
| Ricky Rubio (6)
| Target Center10,106
| 2–2
|- style="background:#cfc;"
| 5
| October 20
| Boston
| 
| Kevin Love (22)
| Kevin Love (9)
| Ricky Rubio (7)
| Bell Centre20,152
| 3–2
|- style="background:#cfc;"
| 6
| October 23
| @ Philadelphia
| 
| José Juan Barea (22)
| Ronny Turiaf (12)
| Rubio & Price (5)
| Wells Fargo Center7,938
| 4–2
|- style="background:#fcc;"
| 7
| October 24
| @ Detroit
| 
| Kevin Love (19)
| Kevin Love (10)
| Kevin Martin (4)
| Palace of Auburn Hills10,107
| 4–3

Regular season

Season standings

Game log

|- style="background:#cfc;"
| 1
| October 30
| Orlando
| 
| Kevin Love (31)
| Kevin Love (17)
| Ricky Rubio (11)
| Target Center17,988
| 1–0

|- style="background:#cfc;"
| 2
| November 1
| Oklahoma City
| 
| Kevin Love (24)
| Kevin Love (12)
| Ricky Rubio (10)
| Target Center17,433
| 2–0
|- style="background:#cfc;"
| 3
| November 3
| @ New York
| 
| Kevin Love (34)
| Kevin Love (15)
| Ricky Rubio (10)
| Madison Square Garden19,812
| 3–0
|- style="background:#fcc;"
| 4
| November 4
| @ Cleveland
| 
| Kevin Martin (23)
| Kevin Love (13)
| Love & Rubio (5)
| Quicken Loans Arena17,892
| 3–1
|- style="background:#fcc;"
| 5
| November 6
| Golden State
| 
| Kevin Love (25)
| Kevin Love (16)
| Ricky Rubio (7)
| Target Center15,559
| 3–2
|- style="background:#cfc;"
| 6
| November 8
| Dallas
| 
| Love & Martin (32)
| Kevin Love (15)
| Kevin Love (8)
| Target Center13,677
| 4–2
|- style="background:#cfc;"
| 7
| November 10
| @ L.A. Lakers
| 
| Kevin Martin (27)
| Kevin Love (13)
| Ricky Rubio (14)
| Staples Center18,997
| 5–2
|- style="background:#fcc;"
| 8
| November 11
| @ L.A. Clippers
| 
| Kevin Martin (30)
| Kevin Love (19)
| Ricky Rubio (10)
| Staples Center19,060
| 5–3
|- style="background:#cfc;"
| 9
| November 13
| Cleveland
| 
| Kevin Love (33)
| Kevin Love (8)
| Ricky Rubio (16)
| Target Center14,978
| 6–3
|- style="background:#fcc;"
| 10
| November 15
| @ Denver
| 
| Kevin Love (28)
| Kevin Love (10)
| Ricky Rubio (12)
| Pepsi Center17,142
| 6–4
|- style="background:#cfc;"
| 11
| November 16
| Boston
| 
| Kevin Love (23)
| Love & Peković (12)
| Ricky Rubio (7)
| Target Center15,111
| 7–4
|- style="background:#fcc;"
| 12
| November 19
| @ Washington
| 
| Kevin Love (25)
| Kevin Love (11)
| J. J. Barea (7)
| Verizon Center14,804
| 7–5
|- style="background:#fcc;"
| 13
| November 20
| L.A. Clippers
| 
| Kevin Martin (28)
| Kevin Love (12)
| Kevin Love (8)
| Target Center13,101
| 7–6
|- style="background:#cfc;"
| 14
| November 22
| Brooklyn
| 
| Kevin Love (17)
| Kevin Love (16)
| Ricky Rubio (8)
| Target Center15,551
| 8–6
|- style="background:#fcc;"
| 15
| November 23
| @ Houston
| 
| Kevin Love (27)
| Kevin Love (15)
| Ricky Rubio (8)
| Toyota Center18,196
| 8–7
|- style="background:#fcc;"
| 16
| November 25
| @ Indiana
| 
| Kevin Love (20)
| Kevin Love (17)
| Ricky Rubio (7)
| Bankers Life Fieldhouse16,426
| 8–8
|- style="background:#fcc;"
| 17
| November 27
| Denver
| 
| Kevin Martin (29)
| Kevin Love (15)
| Ricky Rubio (11)
| Target Center14,244
| 8–9
|- style="background:#cfc;"
| 18
| November 30
| @ Dallas
| 
| Kevin Martin (27)
| Kevin Love (11)
| Ricky Rubio (7)
| American Airlines Center20,173
| 9–9

|- style="background:#fcc;"
| 19
| December 1
| @ Oklahoma City
| 
| Kevin Martin (24)
| Kevin Love (12)
| Ricky Rubio (7)
| Chesapeake Energy Arena18,203
| 9–10
|- style="background:#ccc;"
| 20
| December 4
| San Antonio
| colspan="7" | Game postponed. Rescheduled to April 8, 2014.
|- style="background:#fcc;"
| 21
| December 7
| Miami
| 
| Kevin Martin (19)
| Nikola Peković (12)
| Ricky Rubio (6)
| Target Center19,888
| 9–11
|- style="background:#cfc;"
| 22
| December 10
| @ Detroit
| 
| Kevin Love (26)
| Kevin Love (16)
| Ricky Rubio (9)
| Palace of Auburn Hills11,251
| 10–11
|- style="background:#cfc;"
| 23
| December 11
| Philadelphia
| 
| Kevin Love (26)
| Kevin Love (15)
| Ricky Rubio (7)
| Target Center13,450
| 11–11
|- style="background:#fcc;"
| 24
| December 13
| @ San Antonio
| 
| Kevin Love (42)
| Kevin Love (14)
| Ricky Rubio (8)
| AT&T Center18,581
| 11–12
|- style="background:#cfc;"
| 25
| December 15
| @ Memphis
| 
| Kevin Love (30)
| Corey Brewer (12)
| J. J. Barea (5)
| FedExForum15,417
| 12–12
|- style="background:#fcc;"
| 26
| December 16
| @ Boston
| 
| Kevin Love (27)
| Kevin Love (14)
| J. J. Barea (11)
| TD Garden17,071
| 12–13
|- style="background:#cfc;"
| 27
| December 18
| Portland
| 
| Nikola Peković (30)
| Kevin Love (15)
| Kevin Love (9)
| Target Center13,776
| 13–13
|- style="background:#fcc;"
| 28
| December 20
| @ L.A. Lakers
| 
| Kevin Love (25)
| Kevin Love (13)
| Ricky Rubio (7)
| Staples Center18,997
| 13–14
|- style="background:#fcc;"
| 29
| December 22
| @ L.A. Clippers
| 
| Kevin Love (45)
| Kevin Love (19)
| Ricky Rubio (12)
| Staples Center19,304
| 13–15
|- style="background:#cfc;"
| 30
| December 27
| Washington
| 
| Kevin Love (25)
| Kevin Love (11)
| Ricky Rubio (9)
| Target Center16,473
| 14–15
|- style="background:#cfc;"
| 31
| December 28
| @ Milwaukee
| 
| Kevin Love (33)
| Kevin Love (15)
| Ricky Rubio (8)
| BMO Harris Bradley Center14,971
| 15–15
|- style="background:#fcc;"
| 32
| December 30
| Dallas
| 
| Kevin Love (36)
| Kevin Love (11)
| Ricky Rubio (13)
| Target Center16,111
| 15–16

|- style="background:#cfc;"
| 33
| January 1
| New Orleans
| 
| Nikola Peković (22)
| Ricky Rubio (8)
| Ricky Rubio (9)
| Target Center14,002
| 16–16
|- style="background:#fcc;"
| 34
| January 4
| Oklahoma City
| 
| Nikola Peković (31)
| Kevin Love (14)
| Ricky Rubio (10)
| Target Center18,065
| 16–17
|- style="background:#cfc;"
| 35
| January 6
| @ Philadelphia
| 
| Kevin Love (26)
| Nikola Peković (14)
| Ricky Rubio (8)
| Wells Fargo Center10,736
| 17–17
|- style="background:#fcc;"
| 36
| January 8
| Phoenix
| 
| Kevin Martin (20)
| Kevin Love & Nikola Peković (12)
| Ricky Rubio (8)
| Target Center12,202
| 17–18
|- style="background:#cfc;"
| 37
| January 10
| Charlotte
| 
| Nikola Peković (26)
| Kevin Love (14)
| Ricky Rubio & Dante Cunningham (6)
| Target Center13,767
| 18–18
|- style="background:#fcc;"
| 38
| January 12
| @  San Antonio
| 
| Nikola Peković (22)
| Kevin Love (7)
| Ricky Rubio (8)
| AT&T Center18,098
| 18–19
|- style="background:#fcc;"
| 39
| January 15
| Sacramento
| 
| Kevin Love (27)
| Kevin Love (11)
| Ricky Rubio & Kevin Love (5)
| Target Center12,399
| 18–20
|- style="background:#fcc;"
| 40
| January 17
| @ Toronto
| 
| Kevin Martin (18)
| Kevin Love (12)
| Jose Barea (5)
| Air Canada Centre19,800
| 18–21
|- style="background:#cfc;"
| 41
| January 18
| Utah
| 
| Nikola Peković (27)
| Nikola Peković (14)
| Ricky Rubio (9)
| Target Center17,111
| 19–21
|- style="background:#cfc;"
| 42
| January 21
| @ Utah
| 
| Love & Brewer (19)
| Kevin Love (13)
| Ricky Rubio (13)
| EnergySolutions Arena16,387
| 20–21
|- style="background:#cfc;"
| 43
| January 24
| @ Golden State
| 
| Love & Martin (26)
| Love & Pekovic (14)
| Ricky Rubio (12)
| Oracle Arena19,596
| 21–21
|- style="background:#fcc;"
| 44
| January 25
| @ Portland
| 
| Kevin Martin (30)
| Kevin Love (13)
| Ricky Rubio (11)
| Moda Center20,006
| 21–22
|- style="background:#cfc;"
| 45
| January 27
| @ Chicago
| 
| Kevin Love (31)
| Kevin Love (8)
| J. J. Barea (7)
| United Center21,637
| 22–22
|- style="background:#cfc;"
| 46
| January 29
| New Orleans
| 
| Kevin Love (30)
| Kevin Love (14)
| Ricky Rubio (6)
| Target Center11,702
| 23–22
|- style="background:#fcc;"
| 47
| January 31
| Memphis
| 
| Kevin Love (28)
| Kevin Love (16)
| Ricky Rubio (8)
| Target Center17,429
| 23–23

|- style="background:#fcc;"
| 48
| February 1
| @ Atlanta
| 
| Kevin Love (43)
| Kevin Love (19)
| Ricky Rubio (11)
| Philips Arena13,018
| 23–24
|- style="background:#cfc;"
| 49
| February 4
| L.A. Lakers
| 
| Kevin Martin (32)
| Kevin Love (17)
| Ricky Rubio (13)
| Target Center12,559
| 24–24
|- style="background:#fcc;"
| 50
| February 5
| @ Oklahoma City
| 
| Ricky Rubio (19)
| Dante Cunningham (8)
| Ricky Rubio (5)
| Chesapeake Energy Arena18,203
| 24–25
|- style="background:#fcc;"
| 51
| February 7
| @ New Orleans
| 
| Kevin Love (26)
| Kevin Love (19)
| Ricky Rubio (6)
| Smoothie King Center16,541
| 24–26
|- style="background:#fcc;"
| 52
| February 8
| Portland
| 
| Corey Brewer (26)
| Ronny Turiaf (13)
| Ricky Rubio (9)
| Target Center17,506
| 24–27
|- style="background:#fcc;"
| 53
| February 10
| Houston
| 
| Kevin Love (31)
| Kevin Love (10)
| Ricky Rubio (9)
| Target Center12,002
| 24–28
|- style="background:#cfc;"
| 54
| February 12
| Denver
| 
| Kevin Love (32)
| Kevin Love (11)
| Ricky Rubio (12)
| Target Center12,139
| 25–28
|- align="center"
|colspan="9" bgcolor="#bbcaff"|All-Star Break
|- style="background:#cfc;"
| 55
| February 19
| Indiana
| 
| Kevin Love (42)
| Kevin Love (16)
| Ricky Rubio (17)
| Target Center
| 26-28
|- style="background:#cfc;"
| 56
| February 22
| @ Utah
| 
| Kevin Love (37)
| Kevin Love (12)
| Kevin Love (10)
| EnergySolutions Arena
| 27-28
|- style="background:#fcc;"
| 57
| February 23
| @ Portland
| 
| Kevin Love (31)
| Kevin Love (10)
| Ricky Rubio (11)
| Moda Center19,458
| 27-29
|- style="background:#cfc;"
| 58
| February 25
| @ Phoenix
| 
| Kevin Love (33)
| Kevin Love (13)
| Ricky Rubio (11)
| US Airways Center16,273
| 28-29

|- style="background:#cfc;"
| 59
| March 1
| @ Sacramento
| 
| Kevin Martin (26)
| Kevin Love (10)
| Ricky Rubio (8)
| Sleep Train Arena17,085
| 29-29
|- style="background:#cfc;"
| 60
| March 3
| @ Denver
| 
| Kevin Love (33)
| Kevin Love (19)
| Ricky Rubio & Jose Barea (5)
| Pepsi Center15,240
| 30-29
|- style="background:#fcc;"
| 61
| March 5
| New York
| 
| Kevin Love (19)
| Kevin Love (8)
| Ricky Rubio (8)
| Target Center14,294
| 30-30
|- style="background:#cfc;"
| 62
| March 7
| Detroit
| 
| Kevin Love (28)
| Kevin Love (14)
| Ricky Rubio (9)
| Target Center16,242
| 31-30
|- style="background:#fcc;"
| 63
| March 9
| Toronto
| 
| Kevin Love (26)
| Love & Peković (11)
| Kevin Love (9)
| Target Center13,116
| 31-31
|- style="background:#cfc;"
| 64
| March 11
| Milwaukee
| 
| Kevin Love (27)
| Kevin Love (10)
| Ricky Rubio (10)
| Target Center12,473
| 32-31
|- style="background:#fcc;"
| 65
| March 14
| @ Charlotte
| 
| Kevin Martin (19)
| Kevin Love (6)
| Ricky Rubio (9)
| Time Warner Cable Arena16,983
| 32-32
|- style="background:#cfc;"
| 66
| March 16
| Sacramento
| 
| Kevin Martin (31)
| Gorgui Dieng (11)
| Ricky Rubio (9)
| Target Center13,171
| 33-32
|- style="background:#cfc;"
| 67
| March 19
| @ Dallas
| 
| Kevin Love (35)
| Gorgui Dieng (11)
| Ricky Rubio (15)
| American Airlines Center20,100
| 34-32
|- style="background:#fcc;"
| 68
| March 20
| @ Houston
| 
| Kevin Love (29)
| Gorgui Dieng (21)
| Ricky Rubio (8)
| Toyota Center18,315
| 34-33
|- style="background:#fcc;"
| 69
| March 23
| Phoenix
| 
| Kevin Love (36)
| Kevin Love (14)
| Love & Rubio (9)
| Target Center17,866
| 34-34
|- style="background:#fcc;"
| 70
| March 24
| @ Memphis
| 
| Kevin Love (16)
| Gorgui Dieng (17)
| Alexey Shved (5)
| FedExForum17,784
| 34-35
|- style="background:#cfc;"
| 71
| March 26
| Atlanta
| 
| Brewer & Martin (18)
| Gorgui Dieng (15)
| Ricky Rubio (10)
| Target Center11,632
| 35-35
|- style="background:#cfc;"
| 72
| March 28
| L.A. Lakers
| 
| Nikola Peković (26)
| Kevin Love (10)
| Kevin Love (10)
| Target Center16,442
| 36-35
|- style="background:#fcc;"
| 73
| March 30
| @ Brooklyn
| 
| Martin & Brewer (21)
| Gorgui Dieng (11)
| Ricky Rubio (12)
| Barclays Center17,732
| 36-36
|- style="background:#fcc;"
| 74
| March 31
| L.A. Clippers
| 
| Kevin Love (20)
| Kevin Love (13)
| J. J. Barea (8)
| Target Center12,172
| 36-37

|- style="background:#cfc;"
| 75
| April 2
| Memphis
| 
| Kevin Love (24)
| Kevin Love (16)
| Kevin Love (10)
| Target Center12,009
| 37-37
|- style="background:#cfc;"
| 76
| April 4
| @ Miami
| 
| Kevin Love (28)
| Kevin Love (11)
| Ricky Rubio (14)
| American Airlines Arena19,661
| 38-37
|- style="background:#fcc;"
| 77
| April 5
| @ Orlando
| 
| Ricky Rubio (18)
| Gorgui Dieng (8)
| Ricky Rubio (10)
| Amway Center16,992
| 38-38
|- style="background:#cfc;"
| 20
| April 8
| San Antonio
| 
| Ricky Rubio (23)
| Gorgui Dieng (15)
| Ricky Rubio (7)
| Target Center10,117
| 39-38
|- style="background:#fcc;"
| 78
| April 9
| Chicago
| 
| Kevin Love (17)
| Kevin Love (10)
| Ricky Rubio (6)
| Target Center13,447
| 39-39
|- style="background:#cfc;"
| 79
| April 11
| Houston
| 
| Corey Brewer (51)
| Gorgui Dieng (20)
| Ricky Rubio (10)
| Target Center16,689
| 40-39
|- style="background:#fcc;"
| 80
| April 13
| @ Sacramento
| 
| Kevin Love (43)
| Gorgui Dieng (14)
| Ricky Rubio (11)
| Sleep Train Arena16,965
| 40-40
|- style="background:#fcc;"
| 81
| April 14
| @ Golden State
| 
| Kevin Love (40)
| Kevin Love (14)
| Kevin Love (9)
| Oracle Arena19,596
| 40-41
|- style="background:#fcc;"
| 82
| April 16
| Utah
| 
| Kevin Martin (36)
| Kevin Love (10)
| Kevin Love (9)
| Target Center14,155
| 40-42

References

Minnesota Timberwolves seasons
Minnesot Timberwolves
2013 in sports in Minnesota
2014 in sports in Minnesota